Harry "The Breaker" Harbord Morant (born Edwin Henry Murrant, 9 December 1864 – 27 February 1902), more popularly known as Breaker Morant, was an Anglo-Australian drover, horseman, bush poet, military officer, and war criminal who was convicted and executed for murdering six prisoners-of-war (POWs) and three captured civilians in two separate incidents during the Second Anglo-Boer War.

While serving as a lieutenant with the Bushveldt Carbineers, Morant was arrested and court-martialled for committing murder on active serviceone of the first such prosecutions in British military history. According to military prosecutors, Morant retaliated for the death in combat of his commanding officer with a series of revenge killings against both Boer POWs and many civilian residents of the Northern Transvaal. Morant's defence attorney, Major James Francis Thomas, demanded the acquittal of his clients under what is now called the Nuremberg Defence, alleging that his clients could not be held legally or morally responsible because they only followed orders.

Morant was accused of the summary execution of Floris Visser, a wounded POW, and the slaying of four Afrikaners and four Dutch schoolteachers who had surrendered at the Elim Hospital, five of whom were members of the Soutpansberg Commando. Morant was found guilty and sentenced to death. Morant and Lieutenant Peter Handcock were then court-martialled for the murder of the Reverend Carl August Daniel Heese, a South African-born Minister of the Berlin Missionary Society. Heese had spiritually counselled the Dutch and Afrikaner victims at Elim Hospital and had been shot to death the same afternoon. Morant and Handcock were acquitted of the Heese murder, but their sentences for murdering Visser, the eight victims at Elim Hospital, and three others were implemented by a firing squad from the Cameron Highlanders on 27 February 1902.

Morant and Handcock have become folk heroes in modern Australia, representing a turning point for Australians' self-determination and independence from British rule. Their court-martial and death have been the subject of books, a stage play and an award-winning Australian New Wave film by director Bruce Beresford. Upon its release during 1980, Beresford's film both brought Morant's life story to a worldwide audience and "hoisted the images of the accused officers to the level of Australian icons and martyrs". Despite the seriousness of the evidence and charges against them, some modern Australians regard Morant and Handcock as scapegoats or even as victims of judicial murder. They continue to attempt, with some public support, to obtain a posthumous pardon or even a new trial.

According to South African historian Charles Leach, "In the opinion of many South Africans, particularly descendants of victims as well as other involved persons in the far Northern Transvaal, justice was only partially achieved by the trial and the resultant sentences. The feeling still prevails that not all the guilty parties were dealt with – the notorious Captain Taylor being the most obvious one of all."

Early life (1864–1882)
Inquiries made during 1902 by the newspapers The Northern Miner and The Bulletin identified Harry Harbord Morant as 'Edwin Henry Murrant', who was born at Bridgwater, Somerset, England, in December 1864, the son of Edwin Murrant (1836–1864) and Catherine (née Riely) Murrant (1833–1899). Edwin and Catherine were master and matron of the Union Workhouse at Bridgwater. Morant's father died in August 1864, four months before the birth of his son. His mother continued her employment as matron until her retirement in 1882. She died in July 1899 while her son was in Renmark, South Australia, just six months before he embarked for military service in South Africa.

Despite his humble origins, Morant could easily pass for a member of the British upper class and created a number of romantic legends about his past, which suggest that he saw himself as a Byronic hero. He was often described as "well-educated". Morant claimed to have been born in 1865 at Bideford, Devon, England, and to be the son of Admiral Sir George Digby Morant of the Royal Navy, a claim repeated as fact by later writers, although the Admiral denied it.

Australia (1883–1899)
According to The Northern Miner and The Bulletin, Morant emigrated to Australia in 1883 and arrived aboard the SS Waroonga at Townsville, Queensland, in June.

At the time, there was no difference in legal status, in either country, between people born in the UK and British subjects born overseas – a category that included a vast majority of people born in Australia. (This did not change until the Australian nationality law of 1948.) Nevertheless, Morant did not regard himself as Australian. His former defence counsel, Major James Francis Thomas, later "reacted strongly" whenever his former client was described as such. In a letter to The Sydney Morning Herald on 16 June 1923, Major Thomas wrote, "Morant was not an Australian, he was an Englishman, who came to this country for 'colonial experience'."

Around a year after his arrival, Morant first settled in outback Queensland. After about a year, he adopted the name Harry Harbord Morant, claiming to be a member of the British nobility and the estranged son of Admiral Morant. During the next fifteen years, he drifted around Queensland, South Australia, and New South Wales. He gained a reputation as a boozer, a womaniser, a bush poet and as an expert horseman. He was one of the few who managed to ride the notorious buckjumper Dargin's Grey in a horse race that became legendary.

Morant worked in a variety of occupations; he reportedly traded horses in Charters Towers, then worked for a time for a newspaper at Hughenden during 1884. He then relocated around for some time until he found work as a bookkeeper and storeman in the Esmeralda cattle station. Morant then worked for several years as an itinerant drover and horse-breaker, as well as writing his popular bush ballads, becoming friendly with famed Australian bush poets Henry Lawson, Banjo Paterson, and Will H. Ogilvie. The bond between Morant and Ogilvie was quite strong, and subject of a book Breaker's mate: Will Ogilvie in Australia. Ogilvie went to write at various times:

 Ode to 'The Breaker' in bandages (1898), after a horse-riding accident
 When The Breaker is booked for the south
 H. Morant 'Breaker' leaves with S.A. Contingent
  'Glenrowan' to 'The Breaker' 
 Harry Morant
 To the memory of Harry Morant (circa 1902)

Enlistment

In 1899, Morant enlisted with the Second Contingent of the South Australian Mounted Rifles at Adelaide. According to a 13 January 1900 report of his enlistment by the Adelaide Advertiser, Morant, like all other volunteers, read and signed the following declaration:

We the undersigned, do hereby solemnly, sincerely and truly swear that we will be faithful and bear true allegiance to Queen Victoria, her heirs and successors according to law, and that we will faithfully severally serve as members of the South Australian Volunteer Contingent enrolled for service in South Africa, and we hereby severally bind ourselves from the 17th day of October 1899, until discharged to be subject to the provisions of the Army Act in force for the time being in Her Majesty's Army, in like manner as if we had been severally and duly enlisted and attested for Her Majesty's Army for general service, and as if the said South Australian Volunteer Contingent formed part of Her Majesty's Army, and that we are in like manner during the same time severally to be subject to the Queen's rules and regulations, the rules and articles of war, and to all such other rules and regulations and discipline of whatever nature or kind to which Her Majesty's Army is for the time being subject, and to all laws, rules and regulations in force within the Province of South Africa under the Defence Act 1895; and also to all rules and regulations re: general orders and for any general officer commanding Her Majesty's forces in South Africa in which we may severally for the time be serving.

Morant was reportedly invited to visit the summer residence of South Australia's governor, Lord Tennyson. After completing his training, he was appointed lance corporal and his regiment embarked for the Transvaal on 26 January 1900.

South Africa (1899–1901)
In many respects, the terrain and climate of South Africa are similar to that of outback Australia, so Morant was in his element. His superb horsemanship, expert bush skills and educated manner soon attracted the attention of his superiors. South Australian Colonel Joseph Gordon recommended him as a dispatch rider to Bennet Burleigh, the war correspondent of the London Daily Telegraph; the job reportedly provided Morant with ample opportunity to visit the nearby hospital and pursue dalliances with the nurses.

A letter written on 23 January 1901 was sent to Admiral Sir George Morant by the Mount Nelson Hotel in Cape Town alleging that Sergeant Morant had stayed there during November 1900, while claiming to be the Admiral's son. "The Breaker" had further claimed to be a war correspondent for the Daily Telegraph and had "left without discharging his liability" of £16/13s. The letter concluded, "We shall esteem it a favour if you will let us know the course we had better adopt. We are averse to taking the matter to court till we had heard from you."

According to his co-defendant, Lieutenant George Witton, Morant served with the South Australian Second Contingent for nine months, during which time he was promoted to the rank of sergeant.

During March 1900, Sergeant Morant carried dispatches for the Flying Column to Prieska, commanded by Colonel Lowe, 7th D.G., who was in the general advance to Bloemfontein and participated with the engagements of Karee Siding and Kroonstadt, and other engagements with Lord Roberts until the entry into Pretoria.  Morant was at the Battle of Diamond Hill and was then part of General French's staff, Cavalry Brigade, as war correspondent with Bennet Burleigh of the London Daily Telegraph.  He accompanied that unit through Middelburg and Belfast to the occupation of Barberton.  His enlistment over, Morant collected his final pay and bonus and traveled to England, where he remained for six months while he attempted to satisfy his creditors or obtain forgiveness for his debts.

It was during this time that Morant claimed to have travelled with Captain Percy Frederick Hunt to England, claiming that he was a good friend of his, and that they had become engaged to two sisters in Devon. In 2020, it was revealed through the discovery of four different marriage certificates that Hunt had personally signed from South Africa, that Morant's statements about his friendship and endeavours with Hunt were false. Hunt had actually been in Pretoria during Morant's given timeline of these events, acting as Marriage Commissioner.

Morant had not obtained the forgiveness for his debts that he had been seeking in England. His options limited, he returned to South Africa to accept a commission with Baden-Powell's Transvaal Constabulary. Morant's plans changed when he obtained a commission in the Bushveldt Carbineers (BVC) on 1 April 1901.

The Bushveldt Carbineers
After their defeats in open battle during 1899–1900, the Boer Commandos began a guerrilla campaign against both British and Commonwealth forces.  In response, Lord Kitchener began pursuing a policy of farm-burning, field-salting, livestock confiscation and forcing the entire Afrikaner population into concentration camps. The families of known Commando members were put on half rations in the concentration camps.

According to South African historian Charles Leach, "The idea of fighting to 'the bitter end' was not a new concept to the Boer mentality. Commandant-General Piet Joubert of the South African Republic had already expressed a similar ideology after the Transvaal War of Independence seven years earlier. He said: 'I bear no hatred against England; I hate no one; everyone is welcome in our country, whether he be a Frenchman, or German, or American, or Englishman. I am always ready to hand him the hand of friendship. But let all the world come and try to trample me down and put his foot on my neck, and try to crush my country, then with twenty men about me I will fight, yes, fight the world entire, fight till I am free or dead.'"

As they were no longer able to receive food and supplies from the civilian population, the Commandos began a practice of derailing trains in order to take and use food and supplies that were intended for British and Commonwealth troops.

The Bushveldt Carbineers (or BVC) were a 320-man irregular mounted infantry regiment that had been formed and commanded during February 1901 by an Australian, Colonel Robert Lenehan.

By the summer of 1901, rumours had reached the Officer Commanding at Pietersburg "of poor discipline, unconfirmed murders, drunkenness, and general lawlessness" among the garrison at Fort Edward, which was under the command of Captain James Robertson of the Bushveldt Carbineers' A Squadron and Captain Alfred James Taylor of the War Officer's Intelligence Department. It was further alleged that a local woman had accused a British Army officer of sexual assault. Further investigation revealed that the alleged rapist was Captain James Robertson. In response, Captain Robertson was recalled to HQ and given a choice between court martial and resigning his commission. Robertson submitted his resignation and quit the British Armed Forces. In response, Captain Percy Frederic Hunt, "an Englishman, a former Lieutenant in Kitchener's Fighting Scouts, and a fine horseman" was ordered to the Northern Transvaal and given command of the Bushveldt Carbineers "B Squadron".

According to South African historian Arthur Davey, "...Hunt was only 28 when he was killed and therefore younger than his subordinates, Morant and Handcock, and only a year older than the hapless Witton. His tenure as a junior officer in the regular army had been short and it can be supposed that his knowledge of military law was limited. At the courts-martial several witnesses, Sergeant S. Robertson and Lieutenants Morant, Handcock, and Picton mentioned that Hunt had given orders that no prisoners should be taken. Ex-Captain Robertson, giving evidence at the trial of Lenehan, stated that he, Taylor, and Hunt had known the truth about the death of Trooper van Buuren which had been concealed 'in the interest of the corps.' As the Heese case shows, the veracity of Morant and Handcock is suspect, whilst Captain Robertson was a man who had turned King's Evidence, so Hunt's reputation remains, as it were, in limbo."

Fort Edward
The exact sequence and nature of the events resulting in Morant's arrest and trial are still disputed, and accounts vary considerably. While it seems certain that some members of the BVC were responsible for shooting Boer POWs and civilian noncombatants, the precise circumstances of these killings and the identities of those responsible will probably never be known for certain.  The following account is drawn mainly from the only surviving eyewitness source, and the 1907 book Scapegoats of the Empire by Lieutenant George Witton, one of the three Australians sentenced to death for the alleged murders and the only one to escape execution.

With Hunt now commanding the detachment at Fort Edward, discipline was immediately reimposed by Lieutenant Morant and Lieutenant Handcock, but this was resisted by some. In one incident, several members of a supply convoy commanded by Lieutenant Picton looted the rum it was carrying, resulting in their arrest for insubordination and for threatening to shoot Picton. They escaped to Pietersburg, but Captain Hunt sent a report to Colonel Lenehan, who had them detained. When the matter was brought before Colonel Hall, the commandant of Pietersburg, he ordered the offenders to be discharged from the regiment and released. In his book, Witton explicitly accused these disaffected troopers of being responsible for "the monstrous and extravagant reports about the BVC which appeared later in the English and colonial press".

Back at Fort Edward, the seized livestock were collected and given to the proper authorities and the stills were destroyed, but according to Witton, these actions were resented by the perpetrators, and as a result Morant and Handcock were "detested" by certain members of the detachment.

Witton arrived at Fort Edward on 3 August with Sergeant Major Hammett and 30 men, and it was at this point that he met Morant and Handcock for the first time.

The Battle at Duivelskloof

Prelude
At the end of July 1901, the garrison at Fort Edward received a visit from the Reverend Fritz Reuter of the Berlin Missionary Society and his family. Rev. Reuter was assigned to the Medingen Mission Station and, despite later claims by his family, he "seems to have been an exception" to the generally Pro-Boer sympathies "of the Zoutpansberg German population". In conversation with Captain Hunt, Rev. Reuter reported that Field cornet Barend Viljoen's Letaba Commando was active at Duivelskloof and had been "harassing local noncombatant farmers". Rev. Reuter further alleged that his own mission station had been threatened. In response, Captain Hunt ordered a detachment under BVC Sergeant A.B.C. Cecil to protect the missionary and his family on their return journey.

After Rev. Reuter's intelligence had been confirmed by a Native runner, Captain Hunt also learned that Sergeant Cecil's patrol had been ambushed near the Medingen Mission Station. In response, the captain departed Fort Edward on 2 August 1901 with the intention of ambushing the Viljoen Commando. In addition to service personnel of the Bushveldt Carbineers, the patrol included Tony Schiel, a defector from the Soutpansberg Commando and Intelligence Scout for Captain Alfred Taylor.

It was to be Schiel's task to command between 300 and 400 irregulars drawn from the local Lobedu people. According to South African historian Charles Leach, Captain Hunt had received "warnings and expressions of caution" regarding "the wisdom of attacking an enemy position at night" without normal reconnaissance of the place. Deciding to proceed anyway, Captain Hunt led "his patrol into a situation that would echo through the next 100 years".

Ambush
According to the diary of BVC Trooper J.S. Silke, Rev. Reuter warned Hunt against attacking. The Viljoen farm, he explained, was built on a rocky hillside and "was unassailable". Furthermore, the nearby Botha farm contained more than 40 armed men who could easily intercept Hunt's line of retreat. Despite the warning and the fact that it was a bright moonlit night, Hunt chose to attack anyway.

After planning a two-pronged attack, Captain Hunt ordered Trooper Silke to wait for a signal shot and rush the farmhouse from behind with 50 Lobedu warriors. Then, Captain Hunt approached the farmhouse via concrete steps terraced into the hillside.

According to the memoirs of Hendrik Adriaan Jacobs, the Viljoen Commando knew that an attack was coming. The members of the Commando, however, were "feverish" from the effects of malaria and fatalistically waited for the arrival of the Bushveldt Carbineers. Jacobs later recalled how he saw Hunt's party through a window and began shooting. Possibly mistaking Jacobs's first shot for the signal, the BVC and the Lobedu also began shooting and general pandemonium ensued. In an exchange of fire, Captain Hunt was shot through the chest.  Sergeant Frank Eland was killed attempting to go to Hunt's aid, as was at least one Lobedu warrior. On the Boer side, Barend Viljoen, his brother J.J. Viljoen, and G. Hartzenberg were killed. The dead of both sides were left behind by their retreating comrades.

Aftermath
When the surviving members of the patrol returned to Medingen Mission Station, Rev. Reuter asked them about their officers and "was told a confusing and contradictory story of what had happened". Decades later, Rev. Reuter's daughter recalled in a televised interview, "My father roused on them, asking how they could leave their Captain like that."

The body of Captain Hunt was later found stripped, with his neck broken, his face stomped on with a hobnailed boot, and with his legs slashed with a knife.

According to Leach, however, Captain Hunt's broken neck would be consistent with a fall down the concrete steps after being wounded. The mutilations found on his body were also found on the bodies of the three dead Boers. Both sides blamed the other for the disfigurement of the dead. Hendrik Jacobs, however, believed that Lobedu witch-doctors were to blame. According to historian Charles Leach, accounts by French anthropologist Henri Junod reveal that the traditional practice of the Lobedu people was to disembowel dead and dying warriors on the battlefield to set their spirits free.

The body of Captain Percy Hunt was buried at the Medingen Mission Station, where a cross was later installed by the Commonwealth War Graves Commission.  Sergeant Eland was buried at his family's homestead, the Ravenshill Farm, after a burial service was read by Rev. Reuter.

Revenge killings
When news of Hunt's death reached the fort, it had a profound effect on Morant; Witton said he became "like a man demented". Morant immediately ordered every available man out on patrol and broke down and cried while giving the news to the men. Captain Taylor then ordered the patrol to avenge the combat death of their captain and to, "Give no quarter".

Significantly, Morant did not see Hunt's body himself; according to Witton, Morant arrived about an hour after the burial. He questioned the men about Hunt's death and, convinced that he had been murdered in cold blood, he again vowed to take no prisoners.  Witton alleges that Morant then declared that he had, on occasion, ignored Hunt's orders to this effect in the past, but that he would carry them out in the future.

Floris Visser
On the morning of 9 August 1901, Lt. Morant assigned a few men to guard the Mendingen Mission, which George Witton alleges the Boers had threatened to burn down in reprisal for Rev. Reuter's ties to the British.

This was true, according to South African historian Arthur Davey; Rev. Reuter, who had served with the Prussian Army during the recent war against France, had repeatedly displeased the Boer Commandos by violating the neutrality expected of missionaries. Even though the missionary had opposed their involvement, some of the Lobedu warriors who fought with Captain Hunt during the attack on the Viljoen Farm were converts to Lutheranism and members of Rev. Reuter's congregation. Furthermore, according to a letter from Bushveldt Carbineers officer Alfred Haserick to the mother of Sergeant Frank Eland, Rev. Reuter had supplied the ammunition used in the same attack. According to Davey, it should therefore come as no surprise that General Christian Frederick Beyers, the Commanding Officer of the Soutpansberg and Waterberg Commandos, had threatened Rev. Reuter with dire consequences if he continued to aid the British Army.

After leaving the Mendingen Mission, Lt. Morant led his men back to the Viljoen farmhouse.  It had been abandoned, so they tracked the retreating Letaba Commando all day.

Morant continued, leading a patrol consisting of both members of the Bushveldt Carbineers and warriors from the local Lobedu people. That evening, after coming upon the Commando's encampment "outspanned in a gully", the patrol prepared to attack. Morant's Afrikaner adjutant, Trooper Theunis Botha, later recalled, "I may say here that for Morant's own cowardice the whole of the [Commando] party would have been caught as every other man in the patrol will testify. Instead of going close up as he could easily have done and so closing the cordon, he started firing at 2000 yards and would not go nearer."

Hearing the shots, the Viljoen Commando scattered. As his comrades fled, 20-year-old Floris Visser, who was unable to walk or ride, was left behind. The Bushveldt Carbineers found him lying under one of the wagons.

Trooper Botha later recalled, "I generally acted as interpreter for Lt Morant. On the evening on which Visser was captured, I acted in that capacity. I asked Visser by Lieutenant Morant's request how Capt. Hunt was killed. He replied that he was killed in a fair fight, shot through the chest. Lieutenant Morant said his neck was broken. Visser vehemently denied it. Before commencing to ask these questions, Lieutenant Morant said, 'If you tell the truth your life will be spared; if you tell lies you will be shot.' He then asked as to the plans of the Boers. Visser replied that the Boers did not intend to stay around there (Little Letaba) but were trekking to the Woodbush to join Beyers' Commando."

As the patrol continued their pursuit of the Letaba Commando, Visser was carried along. Trooper Botha continues: "In the morning similar questions were again asked him by Lieutenant Morant, who again promised to spare his life if he answered truthfully. Visser answered every question truthfully as subsequent events proved."

According to BVC Trooper Edward Powell, "After being captured he was conveyed in a cape cart about fifteen miles. When we outspanned, I heard that Lieutenants Morant, Handcock, and Picton would hold a court-martial and that Visser would probably be shot. Visser was in the cart all the time to the best of my belief and was not present at the court-martial."

According to Trooper Botha, "When [Henry] Ledeboer told Visser he was about to be shot, I heard Visser remind Lieutenant Morant through the interpreter that he had promised to spare his life if he had answered all his questions. Lieutenant Morant said, 'It is idle talk. We are going to shoot you,' or words to that effect."

According to Trooper James Christie, a New Zealander from Clutha on the South Island, when Morant ordered the patrol to form a firing squad, the men objected and one of the Lieutenants shouted, "If you're so damn chicken-hearted, I'll shoot him myself."

Before taking his place in the firing squad, Trooper Botha told Trooper Christie about Visser, "I know him good. I went to school with him. I don't like to do it, but they will shoot me if I don't."

The squad consisted of BVC Troopers A.J. Petrie, J.J. Gill, Wild, and T.J. Botha. Trooper Christie watched as the Lobedu lifted Visser out of the cape cart in a blanket and laid him down twenty yard away in a sitting position with his back to the firing squad.

Trooper Powell further alleged that the Lobedu danced "the war dance before Visser before he was shot".

A volley rang out and Visser fell backwards from his sitting position. A coup de grâce was delivered by BVC Lt. Harry Picton.

Lieutenant Morant then approached Trooper Christie and said, "I know it's hard times for him, but it's got to be done, see how the Boers knocked Captain Hunt about."

According to Trooper Christie, "I said that Captain Hunt had died a soldier's death—that he was killed in a 'fair go' and beyond being stripped, there was no maltreatment of him and how the Kaffirs might have stripped him. He said no; that Captain Hunt's tunic and trousers had been found in the Cape cart. 'But,' I said, 'the boy was not wearing them.' 'Anyhow,' he said, 'its got to be done. It's unfortunate that he should be the first to suffer.' I still held that it was not right to shoot him after carrying him for so far. But as up to this time Morant and I had been good friends, I said no more, but tore off my 'B.V.C.' badge and cursed such a form of soldiering. Then we saddled up and trekked for home."

On the orders of the officers, Visser was buried by the Lobedu in a shallow grave near Blas Perreira's Shop along the Koedoes River.

Even though Floris Visser had revealed information that placed his comrades at risk, his name was posthumously added to the Soutpansberg Commando's Roll of Honour.

On the return journey to the fort, Morant's unit stopped for the night at the store of a British trader, a Mr Hays, who was well known for his hospitality.  After they left, Hays was raided by a party of Boers who looted everything he owned.  When Morant and his men arrived back at Fort Edward, they learned that a convoy under Lieutenant Neel had arrived from Pietersburg the previous day, just in time to reinforce Captain Taylor against a strong Boer force that attacked the fort. During the encounter, one Carbineer was wounded and several horses were shot.

In a letter to Major Wilfred Bolton, Australian BVC Trooper R.M. Cochrane recalled the fallout from Visser's murder, "After the shooting of the wounded Boer, F. Visser, the faithful Kaffirs refused to reveal the whereabouts of their Boer masters. Presumably, they tended them themselves in the bush. One Kaffir, when commanded by Capt. Taylor to reveal the whereabouts of a wounded Boer, curtly replied, 'Kona', which was a direct refusal. Capt. Taylor shot him dead with his revolver."

Other killings followed.

The Eight Boers Case
On 20 August 1901, Captain Taylor received a report from his agent Henry Ledeboer, saying that eight Boer prisoners had surrendered to him and to BVC Trooper A.S. Petrie near the Swiss-run Elim Hospital. BVC Sergeant J.C. Wrench and a patrol of eight men were sent to intercept the party and to take charge of the prisoners. Before they left, Sgt. Wrench was reminded by BVC Corporal Albert van der Westhuizen, an Afrikaner "joiner", that Morant had ordered that no more prisoners were to be brought in, as the Troopers would then have to share their rations with them. After taking command of the prisoners, Sgt. Wrench and his patrol had made it as far as the Elim Hospital when they were met by Lts. Morant, Handcock, and Witton, along with Sgt.-Maj. Hammett and Troopers A.W.M. Thompson and A. Ducket.

Lt. Morant ordered Sgt. Wrench and his patrol to return to Fort Edward as an advance guard.

Lt. Morant told Sgt. Wrench's patrol to ride on about a mile ahead. Morant also said, "If you hear shots in front of you gallop back to the wagon."

According to BVC Trooper Albert van der Westhuizen, "He told us to scout as we went along as a large number of Boers were close at hand. We did not scout, as we knew this all to be moonshine."

As they stopped at Elim Hospital, the Troopers were noticed by Rev. Carl August Daniel Heese of the Berlin Missionary Society's Station at Potgietersrus.

At the request of a senior Australian Intelligence Officer named Captain Frederick de Bertodano, Rev. Heese and his driver, a member of the Southern Ndebele people, had travelled from Potgietersrus in to bring Mr. Craig, a British shopkeeper and Army Intelligence Scout, to be treated at the Elim Hospital. But as Rev. Heese and his driver began their journey back home to Potgietersrus, the missionary recognized one of his friends among the eight prisoners.

Only four of the eight prisoners were Afrikaners. The rest were Dutch schoolteachers who had come to the Northern Transvaal on a teaching contract funded in Amsterdam. One of them was W.D. Vahrmeijer, the former head teacher at the Emmanuel School in Potgietersrus.

In a letter to the Berlin Missionary Society, Rev. Heese's wife Johanna wrote, "As he turned a corner he saw a wagon with 8 Boers who had surrendered—that is given up their arms, and they were now, as they thought, to be taken to some sort of camp. They were guarded by Lieutenants [Morant] and Handcock of the Sweetwaters Camp and some Australian soldiers who were lying in the grass. Rev. Daniel Hesse recognized one of the prisoners as the head schoolmaster of our village, an extremely nice Dutchman named [Vahrmeijer]... Daniel went straight up and spoke to him. The schoolmaster said that he and the other prisoners were very uneasy as to their ultimate fate, although they had surrendered voluntarily. Daniel comforted them by telling them that nothing could happen to them. The guards became angry with Daniel for speaking to the prisoners, and ordered him to get up onto the wagon and consider himself also a prisoner. Daniel refused, saying that they might have prevented him from approaching the prisoners, that he was in possession of a pass from the commander at Pietersburg allowing him to travel freely, and promised to report himself at the camp and bring his passport with him. The prisoners were then removed..."

Trooper van der Westhuizen later recalled, "We rode leisurely along the road. We travelled about three-quarters of a mile when we heard three shots which were fired by Messes Ledeboer and Schwartz of the Intelligence attached to the BVC. We met them with their rifles so we knew they fired the shots. These shots were fired in accordance with a pre-arranged plan in order to simulate a Boer attack. Immediately we heard those three signal shots in front, we heard the volley fired to our rear and we knew the prisoners were being shot... After hearing the shots we rode on. By Sweetwaters Farm we met Capt. Taylor. He asked Sergt. Wrench if he heard any shots. Sergt. Wrench for private reasons said, 'No,' as he did not know what Capt Taylor would do if he said he had heard them. Capt. Taylor said, 'All right, go the fort and get off saddle.'"

The known names of the victims were C.P.J. Smit, M. Logenaar, M. Baaukens, W.D. Vahrmeijer, G.K. Westerhof, B. Wouters, and J.J. Du Preez.

In his memoir Scapegoats of the Empire, Lt. George Witton alleges that one of the eight victims, "a big powerful Dutchman", lunged at him moments before the firing squad started shooting. He claims to have been told by Henry Ledeboer after shooting the Dutchman that the man who lunged at him was "a most notorious scoundrel" and "the head of a band of marauders". The bodies of all eight victims were then buried in a mass grave.

According to South African historian Charles Leach, the man who lunged at Lt. Witton was Carl P.J. Smit, who was in reality a Deacon at his Dutch Reformed parish. In a signed deposition, Trooper van der Westhuizen said that he believed that the only reason why Carl Smit had been included with the other prisoners was that Henry Ledeboer's father-in-law, Monty Ash, owed Smit the sum of £130.

Although the Bushveldt Carbineers later alleged that all eight victims were Commando members, in reality, only five of them, Westerhof, Smit, Logenaar, Du Preez, and Pauskie were added to the Soutpansberg Commando's Roll of Honour.

Rev. Daniel Heese

Captain de Bertodano later wrote, "To my great surprise, about the last week of August 1901, I received a wire from McWilliams to say that the Mission Station at P.P. Rust urgently required the return of the Rev. Heese. I immediately wired from H.Q. to Fort Edward asking for a full explanation as to why Mr. Heese had been detained for several weeks. The reply made some excuse for this, and said that he was leaving the next day, about 26th or 27th of August. About the 29th August a further wire came to say that the Reverend Heese had been shot by Boers near Bandolier Koopjes, 15 miles from Fort Edward on the Pietersburg Road. That a Predicant (or Missionary) had been shot by Boers was a yarn I could not swallow!"

As, "rumours had been seeping in to Pietersburg of the behaviour of the Carbineers", Captain de Bertodano decided to begin an investigation. He later recalled, however, "We could get no further information from Fort Edward about this affair, as the telegraph line was out of order! It always was when it suited Fort Edward not to communicate."

In response, Captain de Bertodano dispatched, "two splendid native scouts", to secretly travel to Fort Edward and question the Black South African boys who worked as servants to the Bushveldt Carbineers and to Captain Taylor's staff. Nine days later, one of the scouts returned alone and brought back information about the murders of Boer POWs and the assassination of Rev. Heese. The latter killing had been committed, according to the boys at Fort Edward, by Lieut. Peter Handcock under orders from Morant.

Reverend Krause, the Berlin Missionary Society's Superintendent in Pietersburg, was just as skeptical of the official explanation as Captain de Bertodano. As a result, Reverend Krause secretly summoned Pastors Sonntag and Endelmann, arranged for them to receive passes, and sent them to the Bandolierkop area to investigate.

The Reports of November 1901 of the Mission Head Office in Berlin later announced, "Their investigation lasted from 8–11 September 1901. They found the grave and marked it with stones and a wooden cross, so that later, when the roads were once again open to free travel, they would be able to find the body again for re-burial at the Makapaanspoort Mission Station. In the same way, they also found the body of the Black servant. He had not yet been buried. So they buried him at the same place where they found him—he was a heathen, Ndebele from Chief Hans Mapala's location in Malapong. Otherwise, they could find nothing new that could clarify the murder and the reason for this terrible deed."

The society later wrote in Missionhaus Berlin, "On 30 October the burial of the murdered missionary Heese Jnr. took place at the Swiss Mission Station Elim. Two days previously, his body had been exhumed at the scene of his murder by English soldiers in the presence of the Missionary Gottschling and placed in a coffin lined with tin and taken to Elim. Apart from the Swiss brothers there were several of our missionaries present. On 30 October at 10 AM, ceremonial burial took place. The Swiss missionary, De Meuron, conducted the service. Missionary Gottschling told the life story of the deceased. The missionaries, accompanied by their Swiss brothers and sisters sang funeral songs. An abundance of wreaths came from far and wide. The officers of the English troops in the vicinity also attended the service."

According to South African historian Charles Leach, "Several eminent South African historians, local enthusiasts and commentators share the opinion that had it not been for the murder of the Reverend Heese, none of the other Bushveldt Carbineers murders would have gone to trial."

The Three Boers Case
Soon afterwards, acting on a report that three armed Boer commandos were travelling to the fort, Morant took Handcock and several other men to intercept them. After the Boers surrendered with a white flag, they were taken prisoner, disarmed and shot.

Later the same day, Major Lenehan arrived at Fort Edward for a rare visit.

Morant persuaded Lenehan to let him command a strong patrol out to search for a small Boer unit commanded by Field-cornet Kelly, an Irish-Boer commando whose farm was in the district. Kelly had fought against the British in the main actions of the war, and after returning to his home he had become a commando rather than surrender.

Morant's patrol left Fort Edward on 16 September 1901 with orders from Lenehan that Kelly and his men were to be captured and brought back alive if possible. Covering  in a week of hard riding, they left their horses  from Kelly's laager and went the rest of the way on foot.  During the early hours of the next morning, Morant's patrol charged the laager, this time taking the Boers completely by surprise; Morant himself arrested Kelly at gunpoint at the door of his tent.  A week later, they returned to Fort Edward with the Kelly party and then escorted them safely to Pietersburg. The British commandant, Colonel Hall, sent Morant a message congratulating him on the success of his mission, after which Morant took two weeks' leave.

The letter
On 4 October 1901, a letter signed by 15 members of the Bushveldt Carbineers (BVC) garrison at Fort Edward was dispatched secretly to Col. F.H. Hall, the British Army Officer Commanding at Pietersburg. Written by BVC Trooper Robert Mitchell Cochrane, a former Justice of the Peace from Western Australia, the letter accused members of the Fort Edward garrison of six "disgraceful incidents":

1. The shooting of six surrendered Afrikaner men and boys and the theft of their money and livestock at Valdezia on 2 July 1901. The orders had been given by Captains Alfred Taylor and James Huntley Robertson, and relayed by Sgt. Maj. K.C.B. Morrison to Sgt. D.C. Oldham. The actual killing was alleged to have been done by Sgt. Oldham and BVC Troopers Eden, Arnold, Brown, Heath, and Dale.

2. The shooting of BVC Trooper B.J. van Buuren by BVC Lt. Peter Handcock on 4 July 1901. Trooper van Buuren, an Afrikaner, had "disapproved" of the killings at Valdezia, and had informed the victims' wives and children, who were imprisoned at Fort Edward, of what had happened.

3. The revenge killing of Floris Visser, a wounded prisoner of war, near the Koedoes River on 11 August 1901. Visser had been captured by a BVC patrol led by Lieut. Morant two days before his death. After Visser had been exhaustively interrogated and conveyed for 15 miles by the patrol, Lt Morant had ordered his men to form a firing squad and shoot him. The squad consisted of BVC Troopers A.J. Petrie, J.J. Gill, Witton, and T.J. Botha. A coup de grâce was delivered by BVC Lt Harry Picton. The slaying of Floris Visser was in retaliation for the combat death of Morant's close friend, BVC Captain Percy Frederik Hunt, at Duivelskloof on 6 August 1901.

4. The shooting, ordered by Capt. Taylor and Lt. Morant, of four surrendered Afrikaners and four Dutch schoolteachers, who had been captured at the Elim Hospital in Valdezia, on the morning of 23 August 1901. The firing squad consisted of BVC Lt. George Witton, Sgt. D.C. Oldham, and Troopers J.T. Arnold, Edward Brown, T. Dale, and A. Heath. Although Trooper Cochrane's letter made no mention of the fact, three Native South African witnesses were also shot dead.

The ambush and fatal shooting of the Reverend Carl August Daniel Heese of the Berlin Missionary Society near Bandolierkop on the afternoon of 23 August 1901. Rev. Heese had spiritually counselled the Dutch and Afrikaner victims that morning and had angrily protested to Lt Morant at Fort Edward upon learning of their deaths. Trooper Cochrane alleged that the killer of Rev. Heese was BVC Lt Peter Handcock. Although Cochrane made no mention of the fact, Rev. Heese's driver, a member of the Southern Ndebele people, was also killed.

5. The orders, given by BVC Lt Charles H.G. Hannam, to shoot at a wagon train containing Afrikaner women and children who were coming in to surrender at Fort Edward, on 5 September 1901. The ensuing gunfire caused the deaths of two boys, aged five and 13 years, and the wounding of a 9-year-old girl.

6. The shooting of Roelf van Staden and his sons Roelf and Christiaan, near Fort Edward on 7 September 1901. All were coming in to surrender in the hope of gaining medical treatment for teenaged Christiaan, who was suffering from recurring bouts of fever. Instead, they were met at the Sweetwaters Farm near Fort Edward by a party consisting of Lts. Morant and Handcock, joined by BVC Sgt. Maj. Hammet, Corp. MacMahon, and Troopers Hodds, Botha, and Thompson. Roelf van Staden and both his sons were then shot, allegedly after being forced to dig their own graves.

The letter then accused the Field Commander of the BVC, Major Robert Lenahan, of being "privy to these misdeamenours. It is for this reason that we have taken the liberty of addressing this communication direct to you." After listing numerous civilian witnesses who could confirm their allegations, Trooper Cochrane concluded, "Sir, many of us are Australians who have fought throughout nearly the whole war while others are Africaners who have fought from Colenso till now. We cannot return home with the stigma of these crimes attached to our names. Therefore we humbly pray that a full and exhaustive inquiry be made by Imperial officers in order that the truth be elicited and justice done. Also we beg that all witnesses may be kept in camp at Pietersburg till the inquiry is finished. So deeply do we deplore the opprobrium which must be inseparably attached to these crimes that scarcely a man once his time is up can be prevailed to reenlist in this corps. Trusting for the credit of thinking you will grant the inquiry we seek."

Arrest
In response to the letter written by Trooper Cochrane, Colonel Hall summoned all Fort Edward officers and noncommissioned officers to Pietersburg on 21 October 1901. All were met by a party of mounted infantry five miles (8 km) outside Pietersburg on the morning of 23 October 1901 and "brought into town like criminals". Morant was arrested after returning from leave in Pretoria.

Captain de Bertodano later recalled, "One afternoon walking through the Camp, I met Morant out for exercise with a young Lieut. of the Wiltshire Regiment (dark red hair, but whose name I forget)... Morant came up to me and said that his trial for the shooting of the Missionary was a scandal and a disgrace to the Army, that he was innocent, and that he was selected as a victim because he had shot a few damned Boers. 'You are the man who has worked up all the evidence and you ought to be ashamed of yourself for the betrayal of your brother officers.' I replied very quietly, 'Morant, I am very proud of having been the cause of bringing you to trial. You know in your heart that you and Handcock murdered poor old Heese because you were afraid that he would report the shooting of the Boers in cold blood. But you were such damned fools as not to realise that we had all the evidence without calling on him. We know who is behind it all and has led you by the nose, but we haven't got him yet... I don't recognize you and that poor fool Handcock as brother officers. You are guilty as Hell and I am glad to help send you there.... Where is your boy? He has disappeared. Have you murdered him, too?' I told the young officer that his prisoner was not allowed to speak to anyone and walked away."

Indictments
The trial transcripts, like all others dating from between 1850 and 1914 but one, were later "destroyed under statute" by the Civil Service. South African historian Arthur Davey, however, considers it far more likely that all the transcripts from those years were "destroyed by the Luftwaffe" during The Blitz. It is known, however, that a Court of Inquiry, the British military's equivalent to a grand jury, was convened on 16 October 1901. The president of the court was Col. H.M. Carter, who was assisted by Captain E. Evans and Major Wilfred N. Bolton, the Provost Marshal of Pietersburg. The first session of the court occurred on 6 November 1901 and continued for four weeks. Deliberations continued for further two weeks, at which time it became known that the indictments would be as follows:

1. In what became known as "The Six Boers Case", Captains Robertson and Taylor, as well as Sgt. Maj. Morrison, were charged with committing the offence of murder while on active service.

2. In relation to what was dubbed "The Van Buuren Incident", Lieut. Handcock was charged with murder and Maj. Lenehan was charged as follows: "When on active service by culpable neglect failing to make a report which it was his duty to make."

3. In relation to "The Visser Incident", Lts. Morant, Handcock, Witton, and Picton were charged with "While on active service committing the offence of murder."

4. In relation to what was incorrectly dubbed "The Eight Boers Case", Lieuts. Morant, Handcock, and Witton were charged with, "While on active service committing the offence of murder."

5. In relation to the slaying of Rev Heese, Lts. Morant and Handcock were charged with, "While on active service committing the offence of murder."

6. No charges were filed for the three children who had been shot by the Bushveldt Carbineers near Fort Edward.

7. In relation to what became known as "The Three Boers Case", Lts. Morant and Handcock were charged with, "While on active service committing the offence of murder."

In a confidential report to the War Office, Col. J. St. Claire wrote, "I agree generally with the views expressed by the Court of Inquiry in the opinions of the several cases. The idea that no prisoners were to be taken in the Spelonken area appears to have been started by the late Captain Hunt & after his death continued by orders given personally by Captain Taylor.

"The statement that Captain Hunt's body had been maltreated is in no way corroborated & the reprisals undertaken by Lt Morant on this idea were utterly unjustifiable.

"Lieut Morant seems to have been the primary mover in carrying out these orders, & Lieut Handcock willingly lent himself out as the principle executioner of them.

"Lieut Morant acquiesced in the illegal execution of the wounded Boer Visser & took a personal part in the massacre of the 8 surrendered Boers on 23 August.

"The two N.C.O.s acted under orders but were not justified in obeying illegal commands. After the murder of Van Buuren, the officers seem to have exercised a reign of terror in the District, which hindered their men from reporting their illegal acts & even prevented their objecting to assist in the crime."

Court-martial

The court-martial of Morant and his co-accused began on 16 January 1902 and was conducted in several stages. Two main hearings were conducted at Pietersburg in relatively relaxed conditions; one concerned the shooting of Visser, the other the "Eight Boers" case. A large number of depositions by members of the BVC were made, giving damning evidence against the accused. For example, a Trooper Thompson stated that, on the morning of the 23rd (1901), he saw a party of soldiers with eight Boers: "Morant gave orders, and the prisoners were taken off the road and shot, Handcock killing two with his revolver. Morant later told me that we had to play into his hands, or else they would know what to expect." A Corporal Sharp said that he "would walk 100 miles barefoot to serve in a firing squad to shoot Morant and Handcock".

Soon after the second hearing, the prisoners were put in irons, taken to Pretoria while heavily guarded, and tried on the third main count, that of killing Reverend Heese. Although acquitted of killing Reverend Heese, Morant and his co-accused were quickly sentenced to death on the other two charges. Morant and Handcock were shot within days of sentencing, while Witton's sentence was commuted to life imprisonment by Lord Kitchener. Kitchener personally signed Morant's and Handcock's death warrants. The Field Marshal was absent on tour when the executions occurred.

Execution
On 25 February 1902, Ex-Captain Robertson was sent to personally collect Morant's and Handcock's death warrants from Lord Kitchener, whose Melrose House Headquarters was very close to Pretoria Prison. According to Robertson, Kitchener signed both death warrants in front of him. As Kitchener handed the documents over, the Commander in Chief glared at the disgraced captain and said, "Think yourself lucky that you're not amongst them.

A frantic Major Thomas desperately tried to appeal to Lord Kitchener, but was informed by Major General W.F. Kelly that the Commander-in-Chief was not expected back for several days. Thomas pleaded with Kelly to have the executions stayed for until he could appeal to King Edward VII, but the General replied that the sentences had already been referred to England – and confirmed.

Captain de Bertodano later wrote, "The BVC had been abolished. The commanding officer, Major Lenehan, had been sent to Pretoria: Witton says he was under arrest, but I doubt this. A day or two after my return to Pretoria, to my surprise Lenehan sent in his name. He had come, he said, to complain bitterly about the indignity put upon three of his officers in that they had been sent to Pretoria in handcuffs. I looked at him and said, 'You are speaking of three men convicted of murder; they are not officers.' He was taken aback and made no reply and left the office. I never saw him again. He [Lenehan] was taken to Cape Town, under escort I believe, and shipped to Australia on the first available steamer."

According to Charles Leach, "The impact of the sentences was stunning. The Lieutenants requested writing materials, after which letters were immediately written to Kitchener, to family members in Australia, and to the Australian Government. Telegrams were also sent. Some of this mail apparently never even left Pretoria, whilst certain letters did arrive at their destinations."

When asked if he wanted to see a clergyman, Morant replied indignantly, "No! I'm a Pagan!" On hearing this, Handcock asked, "What's a Pagan?" and after hearing the explanation, declared, "I'm a Pagan too!"

According to Charles Leach, however, "This is contradictory to the Pretoria Prison Admission Register, where they both indicated their membership in Christian churches: Morant as Ch. of E. (Church of England) and Handcock as R.C. (Roman Catholic)."

As the afternoon wore on, all the prisoners could clearly hear the sound of coffins being built in the nearby workshop. At 16:00 hours, Witton was told he would be leaving for England at five o'clock the next morning.

That night, Morant, Picton, Handcock and Witton had a last supper together; at Morant's request, he and Handcock were allowed to spend their last night in the same cell. Morant spent most of the night writing and then penned a final sardonic verse, which he titled, Butchered to Make a Dutchmen's Holiday.

Morant also wrote a confession which read

To the Rev. Canon FisherPretoriaThe night before we're shotWe shot the Boers who killed and mutilatedour friend (the best mate I had on Earth)Harry Harbord MorantPeter Joseph Handcock

At 05:00 hours on 27 February, Witton was taken away and was allowed to say a brief farewell to Morant and Handcock, but was only allowed to see them through the small gate in the cell door and clasped hands.

Shortly before 06:00 hours, Morant and Handcock were led out of the fort at Pretoria to be executed by a firing squad from the King's Own Cameron Highlanders. Both men refused to be blindfolded; Morant gave his cigarette case to the squad leader. His last words were reported as: "Shoot straight, you bastards! Don't make a mess of it!". A contemporary report from The Argus on 3 April 1902, however, has his last words as "Take this thing (the blindfold) off," and on its removal, "Be sure and make a good job of it!" Witton wrote that he was by then at Pretoria railway station and heard the volley of shots that killed his comrades. However, Robert Poore, who attended the execution, wrote in his diary that he put Witton and Lieutenant Picton on the train that left at 05:30 hours. Thus, Witton would have been several miles on the way to Cape Town when the execution occurred.

Personal life

On 13 March 1884, Morant married Daisy May O'Dwyer (Daisy Bates), who was later to become famous as an anthropologist. Morant declared his age to be twenty-one, but he was actually nineteen, which made their marriage illegal. The Morants separated soon afterwards and never formally divorced. Daisy threw the Breaker out after he first failed to pay for their wedding and then stole a saddle and several pigs.

Morant claimed, at a Court of Enquiry in South Africa, to have become engaged to one of two sisters in England, with Captain Percy Hunt being engaged to the other.

Legacy
The newly federated Australian government demanded an explanation from Kitchener who, on 5 April 1902, sent a telegram to the Australian Governor-General, which was published in its entirety in the Australian press. It reads as follows:

In reply to your telegram, Morant, Handcock and Witton were charged with twenty separate murders, including one of a German missionary who had witnessed other murders. Twelve of these murders were proved. From the evidence it appears that Morant was the originator of these crimes which Handcock carried out in cold-blooded manner. The murders were committed in the wildest parts of the Transvaal, known as Spelonken, about eighty miles north of Pretoria, on four separate dates namely 2 July, 11 August, 23 August, and 7 September. In one case, where eight Boer prisoners were murdered, it was alleged to have been done in a spirit of revenge for the ill treatment of one of their officers – Captain Hunt – who was killed in action. No such ill-treatment was proved. The prisoners were convicted after a most exhaustive trial, and were defended by counsel. There were, in my opinion, no extenuating circumstances. Lieutenant Witton was also convicted but I commuted the sentence to penal servitude for life, in consideration of his having been under the influence of Morant and Handcock. The proceedings have been sent home.

During 1981, South African historian Dr. C.A.R. Schulenburg wrote to the Public Record Office and was informed by letter that the trial transcripts, like almost all others dating from between 1850 and 1914, had "been destroyed under statute" by the Civil Service between 1923 and 1958.

George Witton was transported to naval detention quarters in England and then to Lewes prison in Sussex. Some time later, he was transferred to the prison at Portland, Dorset, and was released after serving twenty-eight months. His release was notified to the British House of Commons on 10 August 1904. On his release he returned to Australia and for a while lived in Lancefield, Victoria, where he wrote his controversial book about the Morant case. He published it during 1907 with the provocative title Scapegoats of the Empire.

Captain de Bertodano later denounced Witton's account, saying, "It is mostly a garbled and untrue version of the facts." The Captain added, however, that, "When the book was published, it was largely bought up by the Govt. as a false presentation of what occurred."

Australian historian Craig Wilcox is equally critical. After expressing disgust that Australian law in 1907 could, "allow a murderer to make money from his story", Wilcox continued, "George Witton's Scapegoats of the Empire promised to tell the truth about a war crime. Instead the book offered a half-truth, one that painted the perpetrators as the victims and the judges as the villains. The half-truth was what many Australians wanted to hear and Witton's book became a rotten prop for a bogus legend that would help Australia win a cultural war of independence."

Alfred Taylor returned to his farm near Plumtree, in Southern Rhodesia. He died of cholecystitis and pneumonia at Bulawayo Memorial Hospital on 24 October 1941. On 31 October 1941, a brief obituary in the Rhodesian Herald described Taylor as one of Rhodesia's "pioneers".

According to South African historian Arthur Davey, "If Taylor enriched himself through the acquisition of Boer cattle, his lasting prosperity was not ensured by it. The National Archives, Harare, has correspondence that points to his having sought financial assistance from the Government later in his life. When he died in 1941 the estate that he left was not that of a wealthy farmer."

Intelligence Scout Henry Ledeboer was never prosecuted for the revenge killings in which he had assisted. He became in later life a well known game ranger at Kruger National Park.

According to Charles Leach, "After the war, Major Wilfred N. Bolton, 2nd Wilts and Provost Marshal of Pietersburg, relinquished his military appointment to become a civilian magistrate. He became Resident Magistrate in Pietersburg and, as such, became involved with some of the descendants of the Bushveldt Carbineers victims. He was deeply committed to the cause of justice by way of compensation for the families of those victims and he soon became well known in the town and surrounding district. The proceeding and handling of the claims involved an exhausting amount of correspondence and bureaucratic dealing with numerous military as well as governmental departments and offices, most of which were located in London. Bolton became admired for his dedication, compassion, and perseverance in that lengthy process that dragged on until 1909 and beyond."

Despite Morant and Handcock's acquittal for the murder of Reverend Heese, the missionary's widow, Johanna Heese, received £5000 from the War Office.

According to Charles Leach, "The British military authorities granted compensation to Mrs. Heese for the death of her husband despite the court finding Handcock not guilty. Surely this is also an 'admission' that the killer was a British soldier? That Handcock was found not guilty by the court for the shooting of both Reverend Heese and his driver was perhaps due to a proper, professional investigation into the murder. The finding of not guilty will never in itself absolve him of suspicion."

Mrs. Pieternella Jacoba Vahrmeijer, whose school teacher husband had been murdered under Morant's orders in the Eight Boers Case, received a £100 down payment followed by another £50 per year.

Mrs. Carel Smit, whose church deacon husband had also been murdered in the Eight Boers Case, received £100, plus an additional £100 for each of her children.

The two daughters of Roelf van Staden, whose father and two brothers had been murdered in the Three Boers Case, received £200 each.

Leach also writes, "After the war, the total number of identified White victims of the Bushveldt Carbineers and the British Army's Intelligence Department was pegged at 22. Local research has subsequently revealed at least 36 known victims, both Black and White."

Even so, the Australian government was so resentful of the executions of Morant and Handcock that they insisted that no Australians be court-martialled by the British military during World War I.

According to historian Charles Leach, "During the 2002 Anglo-Boer War Centenary Celebrations, an extremely well planned and presented reenactment of the Court-Martial was produced in Pietersburg. The organizing committee comprising a team of historians and enthusiasts was headed by Prof. Louis Changuinon. Many descendants of the actual victims were present at the 'hearing', which took place at the Pietersburg Club, a block away from the house where the actual trial was held. At that part of the hearing when witnesses were called to testify in the Heese case, an element of surprise occurred when Prof. Malie Smuts, granddaughter of Reverend Heese stepped forward and presented items that had been recovered from her grandfather's cart by the British military and returned to the Heese family after the war. These items were a small shotgun, a Bible, and a fob watch."

Literature on Morant and conflicting theories about the case

Morant's life, exploits, trial and execution have been examined in several books and numerous press and internet articles, but as noted above, each account varies very considerably from the others in both the facts presented and their interpretation. There are facts intermingled with fiction.

The most important primary source, the official record of the court-martial, vanished after the trial, and its location remains a mystery. A report on the case from Kitchener to the Australian Governor-General (published in the Australian press on 7 April 1902) quotes Kitchener as saying that "the proceedings have been sent home" [i.e. to England]. Whatever their actual fate, the transcripts have not been seen since the trial and evidently not even the Australian government was granted access to them.

In the 'Afterword' to the 1982 reprint of Witton's book, G.A. Embleton states that

...the British authorities have been approached by many researchers eager to examine the transcripts thought to be held by the War Office. Invariably these requests have been met with denials that the documents exist or pronouncements to the effect that they cannot be released until the year 2002 ... It now appears that the papers never reached England ... (it was) recently announced that the court-martial papers had been discovered in South Africa...

A comprehensive record of the trial of Morant and Handcock, complete with a large number of depositions by members of the BVC and other witnesses of the deeds of Morant and Handcock, appears in Arthur Davey's publication, Breaker Morant and the Bushveldt Carbineers.

During 2012, South African historian Charles Leach published the book The Legend of Breaker Morant is DEAD and BURIED: A South African version of the Bushveldt Carbineers in the Zoutpansberg, May 1901 – April 1902. Based upon extensive research, Leach had complete access to unpublished South African sources and the papers of the Viljoen and Heese families.

Joe West, a British Bushveldt Carbineers researcher, wrote in response: "Charles Leach's impressive research has revealed that the crimes of Morant and his associates were worse than originally thought. In today's day and age Morant and Handcock plus several others would be arraigned before a War Crime Tribunal."

Primary sources

In the absence of the original trial records, three primary sources remain. The first is the report of the trial printed in The Times during April 1902; the second is George Witton's account of the events of 1901–02, contained in his book Scapegoats of the Empire. The third is a letter about the case, written by Witton to Major Thomas during 1929, which was kept secret at Witton's request until 1970. In it, Witton suggests that although Handcock confessed to the crimes, he did so under duress.

More recently, a diary written by Robert Poore, the provost marshal at the time, was unearthed with a record for 7 October 1901. It reads:

Different commentators have taken the diary entry either to mean that an order to take no prisoners did exist, exonerating Morant and Handcock, or that they had clearly acted wrongly by accepting a surrender from the Boers but then shooting them.

Other accounts

Wilcox, in Australia's Boer war : the war in South Africa 1899-1902, states the next important book in creating the Morant myth was Cutlack's Breaker Morant (1962), a short book as much a cartoon version of reality as The Bulletin once presented. Cutlack's story, said Wilcox, was based on Witton's Scapegoats and Frank Fox's Breaker Morant.

The 1976 book The Australians at the Boer War by Australian writer R.L. Wallace gives a concise and reasonably detailed account of Morant's military career, trial and execution although it contains almost no information about Morant's earlier life and omits a number of significant details contained in Witton's account of the events resulting in Morant's trial. However, Wallace was writing an overall account of the Australians' role in South Africa, not the life of Morant, Handcock or Witton.

The most widely known book is the best-selling Australian novel The Breaker by Kit Denton, first published in 1973 and inspired by Denton's meeting and conversation with a Boer War veteran who had known Morant. Wilcox suggested this book is a follow-on from Cutlack's book and helped establish the myth. However, Denton claimed that Morant and Handcock were executed in Pietersburg and buried near that spot. This mistake appeared in his book as late as 1981, and is a possible explanation as to why there is confusion about the location of the execution, i.e., Pretoria or Pietersburg.

Kenneth Ross's 1978 successful and widely acclaimed play Breaker Morant: A Play in Two Acts, was adapted by Ross and Bruce Beresford into Beresford's 1980 movie Breaker Morant. The movie was nominated for the 1980 Academy Award for a screenplay adapted from another source.

Legacy

Although it is generally accepted that Morant and/or others in his regiment were responsible for the deaths of a number of Boer commandos, historical opinion is still divided over the main questions of the case – how many Boers were killed, by whom were they killed, and on whose orders? In his book, Born to Fight, Neil Speed has photos of a number of Canadian Scouts wearing black feathers (pp. 105 & 119.), a symbol that they would shoot any armed Boer they captured.

Morant's devotees, however, argue that he and Handcock were unfairly singled out for punishment even though many other British soldiers were known to have committed summary executions of Boer prisoners. In their opinion, the two Australians were made scapegoats by the British, who were intent on concealing the existence of the "take no prisoners" policy against Boer insurgents – a policy which, they claim, had been promulgated by Kitchener himself.

However, Hamish Paterson, a South African military historian and a member of the Military History Society, has emphasised that the Bushveldt Carbineers were a British Imperial unit, not an Australian one: technically, the two "Aussies" were British officers.

A 2002 book by Nick Bleszynski, Shoot Straight, You Bastards': The True Story Behind The Killing of 'Breaker' Morant, promoted the "scapegoat" argument. It said that while Morant and the others probably committed some crimes and may well have deserved disciplinary action, there is now persuasive evidence from several sources to show that the Kitchener 'no prisoners' order did indeed exist, that it was widely known among both the British and Australian troops and was performed by many disparate units. It also asserted that the court-martial's procedures were flawed.

The graves of Morant and Handcock were left unattended for many years, but after the release of Beresford's movie it became a popular place of pilgrimage for Australian tourists.  During June 1998, the Australian Government spent $1,500 refurbishing the gravesite with a new concrete slab. The marble cross which stood over the grave had been vandalised, as had many other gravestones nearby.

A series of monuments now mark the locations of some of the incidents, including that of the night attack, and the site of the mass grave of eight burghers.

Petition

During 2002, a group of Australians travelled to South Africa and held a service at the Pretoria graveside to commemorate the execution on the morning of its hundredth anniversary.  The service was also attended by the Australian High Commissioner to South Africa.  The group left a new marker on the grave.

A petition to pardon Morant and Handcock was sent to Queen Elizabeth II during February 2010.  The petition has been severely criticised in South Africa, specifically by descendants of the Viljoen brothers who were killed in the skirmish with Hunt and Eland and by the descendants of the family of Rev. Heese.

Hamish Paterson states:  "I don’t think they [the Australian supporters of a Morant pardon] have actually considered what Morant was convicted of. Let's start off with the laws of war. If for example, we have a surrender. You want to surrender and I don’t accept your surrender, so I choose not to accept it, that I’m entitled to do. [...] However, the situation changes dramatically once I accept your surrender, then I must remove you from the battlefield to a POW camp and keep you safe. If, for example, Kitchener said, "take no prisoners", that was very different from "shoot prisoners!" So Morant and Handcock made two very basic errors: Once you've accepted the surrender, you take them to the railway line and get them shipped off to Bermuda, or wherever. At that point, the sensible thing to do was to ship them off to a POW camp. The next error was to shoot these guys in front of a neutral witness, and then you kill the witness. These are a series of terrible errors of judgement. Because they killed a German missionary, the Kaiser (became) involved. [...] Technically, the two "Aussies" were British officers. The problem was you were dealing with an unstable set-up in the BVC. It had just been formed. I don't see a regular Australian unit behaving that way. I rather suspect why no British guys were shot was that they were either regular army or militia, or yeomanry, all of which are very unlikely to actually shoot prisoners. I think no British were shot because they hadn't made the mistake of shooting prisoners who'd already surrendered."

Jim Unkles, an Australian lawyer, submitted two petitions during October 2009, one to Queen Elizabeth II and the other to the House of Representatives Petitions Committee, to review the convictions and sentences of Morant, Handcock, and Witton.  The petitions were referred to the British Crown by the Australian Attorney General.  On Monday, 27 February 2012, in a speech delivered to the House of Representatives on the hundred-and-tenth anniversary of the sentencing of the three men, Alex Hawke, the Member for Mitchell (NSW), described the case for the pardons as "strong and compelling".

During November 2010, the British Ministry of Defence stated that the appeal had been rejected:  "After detailed historical and legal consideration, the Secretary of State has concluded that no new primary evidence has come to light which supports the petition to overturn the original courts-martial verdicts and sentences." The decision was supported by Australian military historian Craig Wilcox and by South African local historian Charles Leach, but Jim Unkles continues to campaign for a judicial inquiry.

During October 2011, then Australian Attorney General Robert McClelland incorrectly claimed by ABC radio that the executed men did not have legal representation at the Courts Martial. In fact, Major J. F. Thomas represented the men.

Nicola Roxon replaced Robert McClelland as attorney general on 12 December 2011. On 9 May 2012, she indicated that the Australian government would not pursue the issue further with the British, as there was no doubt that the three men had committed the killings for which they were convicted, and the Australian government's position is that pardons are appropriate only when an offender is both "morally and technically innocent" of the offence.  Roxon also noted the seriousness of the offences involved, explaining that "I consider that seeking a pardon for these men could be rightly perceived as 'glossing over' very grave criminal acts." After Roxon's announcement, McClelland said he would write to the British government expressing his concern about the lack of procedural fairness for the three accused.

Discovery of relics

During April 2016 it was announced that a person searching through rubbish at the council tip in Tenterfield, New South Wales, had recovered a rotting hessian sack containing an old mail bag; this was found to contain numerous items that likely belonged to Morant. The items found included a number of personal effects engraved with Morant's name and/or his initials, including a penny on a leather thong, engraved with his name, which has a roughly circular nick on the edge. Other Morant effects contained in the bag included fragments of a trumpet, a bayonet scabbard, a bandolier, a cigarette case, brass drinking cups engraved with the initials HM, army field mess equipment, and a Boer War medal. The cache also included an Australian red ensign. The ensign had been signed by Thomas in ink on one of the white stars and has the following inscription:

"This flag bore witness [to] utter scapegoats of the Empire Feb 27 1902 Pretoria."

"Signed J F Thomas."

"Handcock Feb 17 1868 Feb 27 1902 RIP."

"Lt Henry H Morant Dec 9 1864 Feb 27 1902 Pretoria RIP."

The bag also contained newspaper clippings and books and papers pertaining to Sir Henry Parkes and the Australian Federation process. A significant quantity of badly damaged documents found in the bag were discarded by the anonymous finder before he realised the significance of the trove. The anonymous finder – known only as "Mr Collector" – subsequently donated the items to Tenterfield's Henry Parkes School of Arts museum, where they are now on public display.

See also

 Military history of Australia during the Second Boer War
 Horse Memorial

References

Bibliography

Books
 Cutlack, F.M. Breaker Morant: A Horseman Who Made History, Ure Smith, Sydney, 1962. (Novel)
 Kit Denton (1973). The Breaker. Angus & Robertson. . (Novel)
 Kit Denton (1983). Closed File. Rigby publishers. .
 West, Joe & Roger Roper (2016) Breaker Morant: the final roundup, Amberley, The Hill, Stroud, UK.  (hardback),  (ebook)

Songs of the Breaker
Jenkin, Graham. Songs of the Breaker, Book Agencies of Adelaide, Hectorville, 1980.

Articles
 
 Ross, Kenneth, "The truth about Harry", The Age, 26 February 2002. (Written on the hundredth anniversary of Morant's execution and the twenty-fourth anniversary of the first performance of his play, the same article appeared in the Sydney Morning Herald of 26 February 2002 in almost identical form )
'Villains or Victims' in Australian War Memorial, Wartime, Issue No. 18, 2002, pp. 12–16.
Wilcox, Craig. 'Ned Kelly in Khaki', in The Weekend Australian Magazine, 23–24 February 2002, pp. 20–22.
Schulenburg, Dr CAR. 'The Bushveldt Carbineers: a chapter from the Anglo-Boer War', in Historia, Vol 26(1), May 1981 (in Afrikaans, translated and reworked at geocities.com)

Further reading

External links

 Text of Scapegoats of the Empire at Project Gutenberg of Australia
 "Move to Bring Morant Home", The Canberra Times, (Friday, 26 September 1980), p.3.
 Breaker Morant executed

1864 births
1902 deaths
19th-century Australian businesspeople
20th-century executions by the United Kingdom
Australian Army soldiers
Australian Army officers
Australian mass murderers
Australian military personnel of the Second Boer War
Australian people convicted of murder
Australian people convicted of war crimes
Australian people executed abroad
Australian stockmen
British colonial army officers
British mass murderers
British people convicted of war crimes
Controversies in Australia
Deaths by firearm in South Africa
English emigrants to Australia
Executed British people
Executed Australian people
Executed English people
Executed military personnel
People convicted of murder by the British military
People executed by the British military by firing squad
People executed for war crimes
People from Bridgwater
British Army personnel who were court-martialled
Executed mass murderers